Prescott Ennis Burgess (born March 6, 1984) is a former American football linebacker and special teamer. He was drafted by the Ravens in the sixth round of the 2007 NFL Draft. He has had three stints with the team. He played college football at Michigan.

Burgess has also played for the New England Patriots.

Early years
Burgess attended Warren G. Harding High School in Warren, Ohio, where he played high school football. He ranked among the nation's best linebackers and defensive backs.

College career
After graduating from high school, Burgess attended the University of Michigan. He started 20 of the 46 games he played in, and was named an All-Big Ten Conference honorable mention in his junior (2005) and senior (2006) seasons.

Professional career

First stint with Ravens
Burgess was drafted in the sixth round (207th overall) in the 2007 NFL Draft by the Baltimore Ravens. He played in his first eight games for Baltimore, recording four tackles before being placed on injured reserve with a hip injury on November 14. He missed the entire 2008 season, after being placed on injured reserve on August 11 with a broken forearm. Burgess played in the first two games of the 2009 season for the Ravens, picking up two tackles.

New England Patriots
Burgess was traded to the New England Patriots on September 22, 2009 in exchange for a conditional seventh round draft choice. He was inactive for the Patriots' Week 3 game and waived on September 28. The trade was conditioned on the games Burgess was active for the Patriots; therefore, the Ravens did not receive any compensation from the Patriots. He was re-signed to the Patriots' practice squad on September 30, in advance of their Week 4 against the Ravens, who would have not been allowed to sign Burgess back off the Patriots' practice squad because of this matchup.

Second stint with Baltimore Ravens
On October 5, the day after their game with the Patriots, the Ravens signed Prescott Burgess off the Patriots' practice squad to take the place of Brendan Ayanbadejo, who went on injured reserve.

Third stint with Baltimore Ravens
On September 3, 2011, Burgess was released during final cuts. He was re-signed by the Baltimore Ravens on September 28, when Baltimore cornerback Dominique Foxworth was placed on injured reserve. Burgess was active for one game, with no statistics. He was waived again on October 4, after Baltimore signed cornerback Bryan McCann. He was re-signed on October 18. He was placed on Injured Reserve November 2, 2011 and the team signed Edgar Jones as a replacement. He was taken off Injured Reserve on December 3, 2011 and immediately released from the team.

While not seeing much time on defense during his stints with the Ravens, he did establish himself as a special teams standout, becoming one of their top tacklers in that unit.

References

External links
 New England Patriots bio

1984 births
Living people
Sportspeople from Warren, Ohio
Players of American football from Ohio
American football linebackers
Michigan Wolverines football players
Baltimore Ravens players
New England Patriots players